Kastania is a former municipality in the Trikala regional unit, Thessaly, Greece. Since the 2011 local government reform it is part of the municipality Meteora, of which it is a municipal unit. The municipal unit has an area of 149.808 km2. Population 868 (2011).

The largest village in the region, presently called Kastanea, is home to Vlachs.

References

Populated places in Trikala (regional unit)